Spending Time with Morgan is the debut studio album by Norwegian singer-songwriter Ane Brun, released on 25 May 2003. Morgan is the nickname of Ane's guitar at the time, though he has since been retired – according to Ane herself on stage in Paris on 19 April 2008.

Track listing

Personnel
 Ane Brun – vocals, acoustic guitar
 Katharina Nuttall – additional vocals and piano on track 5
 Thomas Dawidowski – double bass, electric bass
 Jonatan Fast – soprano saxophone on track 8
 Per-Ola Vallgren – drums and percussion, piano on tracks 1 & 12
 Andreas Rydman – pedal steel guitar and electric guitar on tracks 4 & 9
 Staffan Johansson – lap steel guitar on tracks 5 & 10
 Leo Svensson – cello on track 3
 Lisa Rydbert, Emma de Frumerie, Leo Svensson, Andreas Westerdahl – violin, viola, cello on tracks 1 & 12

External links

2003 debut albums
Ane Brun albums